Bures-en-Bray (literally Bures in Bray) is a commune in the Seine-Maritime department in the Normandy region in northern France.

Geography
The river Béthune flows through the middle of the village.

Population

Places of interest
 The church of St. Aignan, dating from the twelfth century.
 The sixteenth century manorhouse de Tourpes.
 The motte of a feudal castle from the twelfth century.

See also
Communes of the Seine-Maritime department

References

External links

 Bures-en-Bray sur le site de l'Institut géographique national 
 Histoire de Bures-en-Bray par J.-E. DeCorde. 

Communes of Seine-Maritime